

The Merri Creek Trail is a shared use path for cyclists and pedestrians that follows the Merri Creek through the northern suburbs of Melbourne, Victoria, Australia.

Route
The path commences at Dights Falls near where Merri Creek enters the Yarra River, and then takes a winding route, mainly following the creek all the way to the Western Ring Road Trail. Hazards include a steep section, unmanageable to all but the most hardy cyclists and close to a school, at Heidelberg Road in Clifton Hill, and a missing section in North Fitzroy that requires leaving the river cutting to cross St. George's Road.

The route is now sealed for its entirety, with the last unsealed sections replaced in 2008.  Along the way it passes by CERES, the Brunswick velodrome and the Coburg Lake park.

At the Western Ring Road Trail, heading west will lead you to the Moonee Ponds Creek Trail, Brimbank Park and the Maribyrnong River Trail. La Trobe University Bundoora campus can be accessed by following the trail east.

Landmarks
CERES
Brunswick velodrome
Coburg Lake
HM Prison Pentridge
Merri Creek Labyrinth

Connections
The path joins the Western Ring Road Trail in the north.
In the south, it meets the Yarra River Trail.
In April 2010, connections to the Capital City Trail were improved with the addition of a new bridge across Merri Creek, 160m south of the junction of Union Street and Merri Parade.

Gallery

References 

Bike rides around Melbourne 3rd edition, 2009, Julia Blunden, Open Spaces Publishing, 
Bike Paths Victoria sixth edition, 2004. Edited and published by Sabey & Associates Pty Ltd. pp124.

External links
An interactive map of the trail as well as others in the Melbourne area is available here: Walking and Cycling Trails in Melbourne
Merri Creek Management Committee
Friends of Merri Creek
Merri Creek Trail Map: Darebin City Council

Bike paths in Melbourne